The wooden spoon is the imaginary and ironic "award" which is said to be won by the team finishing in last place in the South Australian National Football League. No physical wooden spoon award exists nor is such an award officially sanctioned by the SANFL.

Criteria
The team which finishes with the worst record across the completed season is awarded the wooden spoon. This is determined by:
 Fewest premiership points (two points for a win, one point for a draw)
 Lowest percentage

Wooden spoons by season

Wooden spoons by current SANFL clubs

Bold indicates clubs currently playing in the SANFL.
North Adelaide joined SAFA in 1888 as Medindie and renamed to its current name in 1893.
West Torrens and Woodville merged at the end of the 1990 season. The merged club has never collected a wooden spoon.
Adelaide AFL Crows reserves first competed in SANFL in 2014 season.

Wooden spoons by former SAFA/SANFL clubs

Old Adelaide Football Club merged with Kensington for 1881 and resigned after 5 games 
Victorian renamed to North Adelaide in 1883 but has no connection with the current SANFL North Adelaide (which joined in 1888 as Medindie and changed its name in 1893) 
Adelaide rejoined the SAFA for 1885 after merging with North Parks from the Adelaide and Suburban Football Association.
Natives after 2 seasons changed their name to West Torrens in 1897 with the introduction of Electoral District Football

Longest wooden spoon droughts

Active wooden spoon droughts

Consecutive Wooden Spoons
Eight clubs have finished last in 4 or more consecutive seasons.

References

http://www.sanfl.com.au/clubs/glenelg/

South Australian National Football League
SANFL wooden spoons